Introductio can refer to:
Introductio in analysin infinitorum, a book on Mathematics by Leonhard Euler
Cosmographiae Introductio, a book on Geography by an unknown author